Kris Trajanovski (born 19 February 1972 in Geelong, Victoria) is an Australian association football player and coach.

Playing career

Club career
After playing with Altona Magic in the Victorian State League, Trajanovski attended the Australian Institute of Sport in 1989. In 1991, he joined National Soccer League team Preston Makedonia. He then joined Rockdale Ilinden in the New South Wales State League in 1992.

Trajanovski joined Hong Kong team Happy Valley for the final six matches of the 1992–93 Hong Kong First Division League season.

He returned to Hong Kong for the 1994–95 Hong Kong First Division League season, playing for South China.

Returning to Australia, he joined NSL club Sydney Olympic in 1995. After two seasons with Olympic he moved to Adelaide City for the 1997–98 NSL season. 1998 saw a move to Marconi where he stayed until 2001. Again moving, he signed for Brisbane Strikers and played two seasons in the Queensland capital. In 2003, he joined Singapore club Tanjong Pagar United. In November 2003 he returned to Australia to play for Melbourne Knights during the 2003–04 NSL season.

His career at national league level finished with the demise of the National Soccer League in 2004. Between 1991 and 2004 he played 314 NSL games, scoring 90 goals. Despite stepping away from the national stage he continued to play state league football. In 2004, he joined Whittlesea in the Victorian Premier League and later had a stint with Seaford Rangers in the South Australian Premier League.

As of March 2011 he was a playing-coach with the Adelaide Cobras in the South Australian Premier League.

International career
In 1991 Trajanovski was a member of the Australian under-20 team at the 1991 FIFA World Youth Championship in Portugal. He played in four matches at the tournament, including the semi-final against eventual champions Portugal.

In 1996 Trajanovski played for Indonesia in an exhibition match against Sampdoria in Jakarta.

Trajanovski made his debut for Australia in 1996 against Kenya in Pretoria. Despite scoring in only three full international matches for the Socceroos, each time he scored a hat-trick. The first hat-trick was in the first leg of the 1996 OFC Nations Cup final against Tahiti in Papeete when he scored four of Australia's six goals. In the second leg of the final in Canberra he scored three goals to lead Australia to an 11–0 aggregate win. His third hat-trick was almost two years later in September 1998. Playing against Cook Islands he scored three or four goals as a substitute in Australia's 16–0 win.

Coaching career
In 2011 Trajanovski was appointed coach of Adelaide Cobras in the South Australian Premier League.

Honours

Country 
 Australia national soccer team
 OFC Nations Cup Champions: 1996
 OFC Nations Cup Runners up: 1998

References

1972 births
Living people
Australian soccer players
Australia international soccer players
National Soccer League (Australia) players
FFSA Super League players
Marconi Stallions FC players
Melbourne Knights FC players
Australian people of Macedonian descent
Preston Lions FC players
FK Beograd (Australia) players
Australian Macedonian soccer managers
Australian Institute of Sport soccer players
1996 OFC Nations Cup players
1998 OFC Nations Cup players
Association football forwards